Pinera railway station is located on the Belair line in the Adelaide southern foothills suburb of Belair, 20.2 kilometres from Adelaide station.

History 
Pinera was opened in the 1920s as Overway Bridge. The name was derived from the bridge that carries Main Road over a cutting immediately west of the station. The cutting came about when the former No. 5 Tunnel was opened as a result of the duplication of the line between Eden Hills and Belair during the 1920s. The station was renamed Pinera at some point before 1947. 

On 31 January 1928, six rail workers were killed and three seriously injured when the No. 5 Tunnel (Former Pinera Tunnel) they were demolishing immediately west of the station, collapsed after heavy rain. 

In 1995, the inbound line was converted to standard gauge as part of the One Nation Adelaide-Melbourne line gauge conversion project.

Services by platform

References

External links

Railway stations in Adelaide